Kardzhali (Kărdžali), sometimes spelt Kardžali or Kurdzhali, is a town in the Eastern Rhodopes in Bulgaria, centre of Kardzhali Municipality and Kardzhali Province. The noted Kardzhali Dam is located nearby.

Name
Named after the 14th-century Ottoman conqueror Kırca Ali, from the Turkish name Kırca and the Islamic name Ali, derived from an Arabic root which means "high" or "elevated".

Geography
Kardzhali is located in the low eastern part of Rhodope Mountains, on both banks of the river Arda between the Kardzhali Reservoir to the west and the Studen Kladenets Reservoir to the east. It has a crossroad position from Thrace to the Aegean Sea — part of European transportation route 9, via the Makaza mountain pass.

Climate
Kardzhali has a hot-summer Mediterranean climate (Köppen climate classification: Csa), that is bordering closely on a humid subtropical climate (Köppen climate classification: Cfa), according to the Köppen climate classification. The city has hot summers and cold winters.

History
The area where the town of Kardzhali is now located has been inhabited since the Neolithic. Many artifacts, comprising ceramics and primitive tools, have been found during the archaeological excavations. Most of them are now exhibited in the local historical museum.

Later Thracian tribes settled in the area and developed a highly advanced civilization. They built many sanctuaries dedicated to the gods of the sun and the earth. Near the village of Nenkovo (northwest of Kardzhali), an artificial cave was found in 2001. It has the form of a woman's womb and is called the Utroba Cave. Exactly at noon, when the sun is highest in the sky, a ray of light comes in through a stone slit forming a falitic shade in the cave. According to the Thracian beliefs, this is the conception of the new sun god. This cave is considered a complex astronomic facility (compared to Stonehenge in Great Britain) as the ray of light enters the cave on a single day of the year.

There are many stone castles and palaces that the Thracians built in the region — Perperek, Ustra, Vishegrad. The most magnificent is Perperikon, where a Thracian king resided. The place has become increasingly popular since the recent archaeological works rendered wealth of artifacts.

During the Byzantine period, Kardzhali was the center of a Christian eparchy — Achridos. During the reign of the Bulgarian Empire, Kardzhali was known as Zherkovo a name that was used by the Bulgarians until the 17th century. The Monastery of John the Precursor (Bulgarian: Йоан Продром or Йоан Предтеча) was built in the 6th-8th centuries and is now a monument of medieval architecture.

A couple of other monasteries were built during this era, with some of them remaining until the early 19th century. The area was of strategic importance for the Bulgarian Empire during the Middle Ages and the remains of numerous Medieval fortress scattered on the surrounding hills can still be seen.

The town developed largely due to its position on the trade routes during the period of Ottoman rule. However, it remained a small town. During the 18th century, Turkish brigands used this remote town as a hideaway and supply point, and the town was later named after their leader Kırca Ali. The best known of these units was led by Pazvantoğlu Osman Pasha, who ruled most of the northeastern Bulgarian lands and the Danube estuary until 1807.

Kardzhali and its neighborhood became part of the autonomous province of Eastern Rumelia under the stipulations of the Berlin Congress of 1878, but, after the reunification of the Principality of Bulgaria and Eastern Rumelia in 1885, it was ceded back to the Ottoman Empire as a township of Gümülcine sanjak in Edirne vilayet. Ottoman rule ended during the First Balkan War when the town and the surrounding area were liberated by the Bulgarian General Vasil Delov on 21 October 1912. The day has been celebrated with concerts and commemorative events as a municipal holiday since 1937. Kardzhali was declared the center of Kardzhali Province, when it was created from the most southern part of Stara Zagora Province in 1949.

Demographics

According to the 2011 census, Kardzhali has a population of 43,880, while the Kardzhali municipality (which in addition to the city also includes 117 villages) has a population of 67,846.

During Ottoman rule before 1912 most of the population of the city were Muslims – Turks, Pomaks, and Muslim Roma. After the Second Balkan war and the First World War, Bulgarian Christian refugees from Eastern and Western Thrace settled in Kardzhali. Some Turks immediately moved to the remains of the Ottoman Empire in 1913 in response to the Bulgarians moving to their lands. Further emigration to Turkey continued between 1913 and 1989. This included two emigration waves in the 1930s and 1950s as a result of treaties between Bulgaria and Turkey and most notably in 1989 in response to the state sponsored Revival Process which saw the forced Bulgarisation of ethnic Turks.

After 1990 the deteriorating economic conditions in Bulgaria (and especially the region) during the post-communist transition led to significant emigration by both Bulgarians and Turks, with the Bulgarians moving to other parts of the country or abroad and with the Turks moving mainly to Turkey.

According to the last census in 2011 Kardzhali Province is the Bulgarian province with the highest relative proportion of ethnic Turks, though Kardzhali municipality and the city itself have a lower proportion of ethnic Turks than the rest of the province. According to the optional question on ethnic identification, the city itself has a Bulgarian majority (many Bulgarians in Kardzhali are Muslims, also known as Pomaks) of 61%, while Turks are 34.9% and others and undeclared are 4.1%. The Kardzhali municipality has a Turkish majority of 55.5%, while Bulgarians are 40.5% and others and undeclared are 4%.  In 2001, the population of Kardzhali municipality consisted of 53% Turks, 42% Bulgarians and others and undeclared. The municipal government today is primarily in the hands of the Turkish-dominated Movement for Rights and Freedoms.

In December 1989 and January 1990 there were a series of demonstrations in Kardzhali against the liberalization of anti-Turkish laws. A particular issue of contention was whether Turkish should be taught in state schools as an elective. In response Turkish students boycotted schools until the ban on using their mother tongue was discontinued.

Economy

Formerly Kardzhali was a tobacco processing center, but for economic reasons all of the communist era industrial plants are no longer operative. The large deposits of lead and zinc ore in the area once made the town an attractive location for the metallurgy and machine building industry. However, in 2016 the no-longer-operative large Lead and Zinc Complex near the city met its final end with its two stacks being torn down.

Nowadays retail trade and services constitute the largest share of local production. The abundance of cultural and natural sights in the area also make it a promising area for tourism.

In 2007 in the city were opened hypermarkets of the chains Technomarket, LIDL, Billa and Technopolis and the construction of the city's new marketplace was complete. In 2014 a hypermarket of the chain Kaufland opened too. However the local economy has stalled.

The percentage of the labour force working in agriculture increased from 41% to 47% in just 7 years (the period between 2010 and 2017). Kardzhali has the second highest percentage of people working in agriculture, after Silistra Province.

Culture and tourism

Mosque and tombe of the founder of the modern city of Kırcali is situated in the old city near the marketplace.

The Thracian town of Perperikon is located near the city on a rock high above the valley. It is interesting for the fact that it is cut in the rock.

The monastery from 11th century is located in the Vesselchane Quarter of the town. It was renovated in 2000 and a new bell tower was built.

The town clock is unique in Bulgaria because it sounds Bulgarian revolutionary songs every hour.

The Kardzhali Museum of History has one of the most extensive exhibitions in Southern Bulgaria. This includes pre-historic tools and ceramics from the Thracian cities of Perperikon and Tatul, Christian icons and ethnographic exhibits. It is located in the old konak (the Turkish town-hall built around 1870) with its period exterior architecture.

There are many open-air restaurants, offering a variety of drinks and cocktails in summer time on the dam. It is a popular place among fans of water sports and fishing.

The town has two drama theaters — "Dimitar Dimov" and "Kadrie Lyatifova", a puppet theater and a museum of history medrese, as well as an art gallery.

 from Kardzhali, near the village of Zimzelen, is a small badlands, where a series of white pillars have eroded out of the volcanic tuff which are referred to as the "Kardzhali Pyramids".  Ensembles have been given names based on resemblances. One is known as "The Mushrooms" and another as the "Stone Wedding".

Kardzhali Point on Byers Peninsula, Livingston Island in the South Shetland Islands, Antarctica is named after Kardzhali.

Longdistance hiking path the Sultans Trail passes Kardzhali dam, city center and many villages.

Sport
FK Arda Kardzhali, founded on 13 October 1924, is an association football club currently competes in the First League, the top tier of the Bulgarian football league system. They play at the Arda Arena.

Dams

The town is situated on the north and south banks of river Arda and it is bordered to the west by Kardzhali Dam, and by Studen Kladenets Dam to the east. At maximum capacity, the waters of the Studen Kladenets Dam extend to the foot of the old Veselchane bridge. The concrete wall of the Kurdzhali Dam is located about two kilometers upstream from that bridge. The banks of the river running through the town have been adjusted by the recently completed Water Mirror reservoir, creating an environment for water sports and recreational activities.

In the 1970s, the reservoir of the Kurdzhali Dam was artificially seeded with sheatfish. Today, specimens that reach  can be found. In the last years 45,000 carp were introduced into the dam as well. Most recently it was artificially seeded with European perch. The fish were taken from the Ovčarica (Ovcharitsa) dam.

Notable people

 Tanya Gogova (born 1950), Bulgarian volleyball player
 Lyutvi Mestan (born 1960), Turkish-Bulgarian politician. Chairman of the Movement for Rights and Freedoms from January 2013 to 24 December 2015.
 Halil Mutlu (born 1973), Turkish world and Olympic gold medalist in weightlifting
 Emin Nouri (born 1985), Turkish footballer
 Tahsin Özgüç (1916–2005), Turkish archaeologist
 Ivo Papazov (born 1952), Bulgarian clarinetist
 Houben R.T. (born 1970), Bulgarian painter
 Taner Sağır (born 1985), Turkish world and Olympic gold medalist in weightlifting
 İlyas Şükrüoğlu (born 1966), Turkish European twice silver medalist and Mediterranean Games champion in freestyle wrestling
 Mehmed Talat Pasha (1872–1921), one of the triumvirate known as the Three Pashas that de facto ruled the Ottoman Empire during the First World War., one of the leaders of the Young Turks and main responsible for the Armenian genocide.

Gallery

International relations

Twin towns — sister cities
Kardzhali is twinned with:

 East Staffordshire, United Kingdom
 Edirne, Turkey
 Elkhart, United States
 Filippoi, Greece
 Gaziosmanpaşa (Istanbul), Turkey
 Komotini, Greece
 Silivri, Turkey
 Soufli, Greece
 Tekirdağ, Turkey
 Vladimir, Russia
 Kukës (Luma), Albania

References

External links

 Kardzhali municipality website (Bulgarian), (English), (Turkish)
 Kardzhali Province — cities and villages
 Kardjali.info — news from Kardzhali and the region
 Yumer Lyutfi Turkish Cultural Organization (in Bulgarian and Turkish)
 News from Kardzhali (in Turkish and Bulgarian)
 Kardjali Press - Online News from Kardzhali

 
Populated places in Kardzhali Province
Cities and towns in the Rhodopes
Place names of Turkish origin in Bulgaria